On 23 December 2017, a commuter bus plunged into a river in Sawai Madhopur, Rajasthan, India. The driver, allegedly an untrained 16-year old boy, died in the crash, along with 32 passengers.

References

2017 disasters in India
2017 road incidents
Bus incidents in India
Disasters in Rajasthan